Rose of the Desert is a 1925 American silent Western film directed by Charles R. Seeling. It was one of series of films made as a vehicle for the animal star Wolfheart the Dog. The cast also included Guinn 'Big Boy' Williams and Peggy O'Day.

Cast
 Peggy O'Day
 Guinn 'Big Boy' Williams
 Betsy Ann Hisle
 Wolfheart the Dog

References

Bibliography
 Langman, Larry. A Guide to Silent Westerns. Greenwood Publishing Group, 1992.

External links
 

1925 films
1925 Western (genre) films
American black-and-white films
Films directed by Charles R. Seeling
Silent American Western (genre) films
1920s English-language films
1920s American films